Rolf Kaarby (6 October 1909 – 7 March 1976) was a Norwegian nordic combined skier who competed in the 1930s. He won a silver medal in the individual event at the 1937 FIS Nordic World Ski Championships in Chamonix.

External links

Norwegian male Nordic combined skiers
1909 births
1976 deaths
FIS Nordic World Ski Championships medalists in Nordic combined
20th-century Norwegian people